Chang'ombe is an administrative ward in the Temeke district of the Dar es Salaam Region of Tanzania. According to the 2002 and 2012 census., the ward has a total population of 27,622.

References

Temeke District
Wards of Dar es Salaam Region